Pelochrista frustata is a species of moth of the family Tortricidae. It is found in India (Jammu and Kashmir).

The ground colour of the forewings is white, sprinkled and dotted brownish cream. The markings are brownish with a weak yellowish hue. The hindwings are cream brownish.

References

External links

Moths described in 2006
Moths of Asia
Eucosmini
Taxa named by Józef Razowski